Pfeil may refer to:

People 
 Friedrich Wilhelm Leopold Pfeil (1783-1859), forestry scientist and founder of the Royal Prussian Higher Forestry College in Eberswalde, Germany
 Bobby Pfeil (born 1943), American right-handed Major League Baseball third baseman 
 David Pfeil (born 1967), American soccer midfielder 
 Fred Pfeil (1949–2005), American literary critic and novelist
 Joachim von Pfeil (1857–1924), German explorer and colonist in Africa and New Guinea
 Mark Pfeil (born 1951), American professional golfer 
 Enzio von Pfeil (born 1953), German economist
 Count Jefferson von Pfeil und Klein-Ellguth (born 1967), German noble
 Valentin Pfeil (born 1988), Austrian long distance runner

Other 
 Dornier Pfeil, a German aircraft from World War II, a heavy fighter
 Pfeil (schooner), from List of shipwrecks in 1929